Brigadier Sir Charles Frederick Carson  (10 February 1886 – 3 May 1960) was a Canadian soldier and engineer who saw active service in both World Wars as a member of the British Army.

Education

Carson was born in Kingston, Ontario, the son of Canadians Robert James Carson and Emma Lavinia Casey. He was enrolled at the Royal Military College of Canada in from 1905 to 1909.  He served as college battalion sergeant-major in 1907–08.

Military service
Carson was commissioned as a regular officer of the Royal Engineers. He was posted to India in 1911 with the 9 Railway Company Sappers. He served as general manager of the North West Railway of India. During the First World War, he served in France and was awarded the Military Cross in 1917:

In 1941, he served as director of transportation, 10th Army, with headquarters at Baghdad with the Persia-Iraq Force in the maintenance of railways. Since it looked as if Iraq, Persia and Turkey would become a battle area during World War II, the British forces in these areas were strengthened. A new command called Persia and Iraq Force (PAIFORCE) was formed in September, 1942, with headquarters at Baghdad. Carson served as director of transportation for Iraq and Persia.

Civilian career
Carson was appointed executive vice president of Montreal Locomotive Works Ltd, manufacturers and suppliers from 1944 to 1951.

Awards and recognition
Carson was knighted in the 1941 New Year Honours for his work on railways. He was appointed Commander of the Order of the British Empire in 1943 in recognition of his services in Persia-Iraq. He was awarded a MC in the 1917 New Year Honours.

Family
Carson married Dorothy Anne Brownfield, with whom he had three sons, Colonel Robert John Carson, Colonel Frederick Sinclair Carson and Peter James Carson, and a daughter, Patricia.

References

Additional sources
Dr. Adrian Preston & Peter Dennis (Edited) Swords and Covenants Rowman and Littlefield, London. Croom Helm. 1976.
Dr. Richard Arthur Preston To Serve Canada: A History of the Royal Military College of Canada 1997 Toronto, University of Toronto Press, 1969.
Dr. Richard Arthur Preston Canada's RMC - A History of Royal Military College Second Edition 1982
R. Guy C. Smith (editor) As You Were! Ex-Cadets Remember. In 2 Volumes. Volume I: 1876–1918. Volume II: 1919–1984. Royal Military College. [Kingston]. The R.M.C. Club of Canada. 1984

1886 births
1960 deaths
Canadian Anglicans
Canadian military personnel from Ontario
Canadian Knights Bachelor
Royal Engineers officers
British Army personnel of World War I
British Army brigadiers of World War II
Canadian Companions of the Order of the Bath
Canadian Commanders of the Order of the British Empire
Royal Military College of Canada alumni
Canadian recipients of the Military Cross